John R. Needham (December 18, 1824 – July 9, 1868) was an American Republican politician, lawyer, and newspaper editor. Born in Washington Court House, Ohio, Needham studied law and was admitted to the bar in Ohio. In 1849 he moved to Oskaloosa, Mahaska County, Iowa, where he founded what became The Oskaloosa Herald. He served in the Iowa State Senate beginning in 1852. In 1857 Needham was nominated by the Republicans for member of the convention to frame a new Constitution but declined the position, and then was elected Lieutenant Governor between 1862 and 1864, serving under Governor Samuel J. Kirkwood. In 1867, Needham was again elected to the Iowa Senate but died in office.

References

1824 births
1868 deaths
People from Oskaloosa, Iowa
Ohio lawyers
Iowa lawyers
Republican Party Iowa state senators
Lieutenant Governors of Iowa
People from Washington Court House, Ohio
19th-century American politicians
19th-century American lawyers